Hatun Hirka (Quechua hatun big, hirka mountain, "big mountain", also spelled Atun Irca) is a mountain in the Cordillera Negra in the Andes of Peru which reaches a height of approximately . It is located in the Ancash Region, Huaylas Province, Pamparomas District, and in the Santa Province, Cáceres del Perú District, northwest of Pamparomas. It borders the Pacific Ocean.

References

Mountains of Peru
Mountains of Ancash Region